Sullenger is a surname, being an Americanized form of the German surname Solinger. Notable people with the surname include:

Bruce A. Sullenger, American physician
Cheryl Sullenger (born 1955), American anti-abortion activist and felon
Jacob Sullenger (born 1995), better known as Jawny, American singer, songwriter, and producer

See also
Solinger